Strange Holiday may refer to:

 Strange Holiday (1945 film), an American film directed by Arch Oboler
 Strange Holiday (1970 film), a 1970 Australian telemovie